The 1915 AAA Championship Car season consisted of 27 races, beginning in San Diego, California on January 9 and concluding in San Francisco, California on November 25. The de facto National Champion as poled by the American automobile journal Motor Age was Earl Cooper and the winner of the Indianapolis 500 was Ralph DePalma. Points were not awarded by the AAA Contest Board during the 1915 season. Champions of the day were decided by Chris G. Sinsabaugh, an editor at Motor Age, based on merit and on track performance. The points table was created retroactively in 1927 – all championship results should be considered unofficial.

Schedule and results

Leading National Championship standings

The points paying system for the 1909–1915 and 1917–1919 season were retroactively applied in 1927 and revised in 1951 using the points system from 1920.

References

General references
http://www.champcarstats.com/year/1915.htm accessed 8/21/15
http://www.teamdan.com/archive/gen/indycar/1915.html accessed 8/21/15

AAA Championship Car season
AAA Championship Car
AAA Championship Car